
Gmina Lipowa is a rural gmina (administrative district) in Żywiec County, Silesian Voivodeship, in southern Poland.

Villages
Gmina Lipowa contains the villages and settlements of Leśna, Lipowa, Ostre, Sienna, Słotwina and Twardorzeczka.

Neighbouring gminas
Gmina Lipowa is bordered by the towns of Szczyrk, Wisła and Żywiec, and by the gminas of Buczkowice, Łodygowice and Radziechowy-Wieprz.

Twin towns – sister cities

Gmina Lipowa is twinned with:
 Oščadnica, Slovakia
 Raková, Slovakia
 Stará Ves nad Ondřejnicí, Czech Republic

References

Lipowa
Żywiec County